Juliette Anne Winter (born 21 February 1971 in Whitehaven, United Kingdom) is an English professional boxer who was the first woman to win a BBBofC-sanctioned professional women's title on 23 July 2006, defeating former ABA super flyweight champion Shanee Martin in an eight-round fight.

Born in Whitehaven, Cumbria, Winter studied Film and Television Studies at the University of Derby whilst establishing a career in full-contact kickboxing. Winter trained with Jane Couch, MBE and Tex Woodward in Bristol. She first began training with former British middleweight champion Neville Brown and heavyweight boxer Clifton Mitchell. Her début fight was against super bantamweight boxer Sara Hall in 2001. After defeating Cathy Brown in 2003 at bantamweight, Winter continued to box around Germany, encountering Esther Schouten and Elina Tissen before returning to England and earning the "British Masters" super flyweight title. Winter currently boxes for TKO Boxing in London and works as a personal trainer and film maker.

Professional boxing record

References

External links
 

1971 births
Sportspeople from Whitehaven
Living people
English women boxers
Bantamweight boxers